OHMS  is a 1980 American made-for-television drama film directed by Dick Lowry. It stars Ralph Waite, David Birney, Talia Balsam, Dixie Carter  and also features Leslie Nielsen as the Governor. It was broadcast on CBS on January 2, 1980. The film is about a conservative farmer in the Midwest who leads a group of local residents lobbying against a power company invading their land.
It was shot on location in New Philadelphia, Ohio.

Plot summary
Faced with a large corporation's attempt to erect large electric towers on private owners' land against their wishes, a conservative farmer organizes community resistance.

Cast
Ralph Waite as Floyd Wing
David Birney as Jack Coker
Talia Balsam as Noranne Wing
Dixie Carter as Nora Wing
Charley Lang 	as Bo Wing
Cameron Mitchell 	as Wilbur
Leslie Nielsen as Governor
Paul Hecht as Thomas Eichen
Roy Poole as Joe Szabo
John Ramsey as Smiley
Nicholas Hormann as David Nash
Tom Toner as Judge Donald Itta
Keith Cosgrove as Dee Wing
John C. Becher as Henry Lucker
Bob Wells as TV reporter
David S. Cass Sr. as Dump Truck Driver

Notes

External links

1980 television films
1980 films
1980 drama films
CBS network films
Films directed by Dick Lowry
American drama television films
1980s English-language films
1980s American films